Elaeocarpus acmosepalus is a species of flowering plant in the Elaeocarpaceae family. It is a tree found in Peninsular Malaysia and Singapore. It is threatened by habitat loss.

See also
 List of Elaeocarpus species

References

acmosepalus
Trees of Malaya
Vulnerable plants
Taxonomy articles created by Polbot